Vader is a city in Lewis County, Washington, United States. The population was 629 at the 2020 census.

History
Vader was originally named Little Falls and incorporated on January 12, 1906. The name was changed to Sopenah by the Northern Pacific Railway because there was already a Little Falls on their rail lines, Little Falls, Minnesota. The townspeople were unsatisfied with the new name and petitioned the Washington State Legislature to change it to Toronto. A dispute then arose which was resolved by a compromise agreement to name the town after a German resident (and Civil War veteran) named Martin Vader. The town name was changed to Vader by the legislature on March 25, 1913. Vader later moved to Florida.

More recently, a motion was made to change the name back to its original name, Little Falls. The motion was placed on the November 3, 2015 ballot to determine voter approval. But as of the last count (November 4, 2015), residents chose to retain Vader as the town name by a 3-to-2 margin.

Vader is the birthplace of the novelist and critic Robert Cantwell and silent film actor Herbert Heyes.

Geography
Vader is located at  (46.401425, -122.958090).

Demographics

2010 census
As of the census of 2010, there were 621 people, 228 households, and 157 families living in the city. The racial makeup of the city was 87.9% White, 2.3% Native American, 1.0% Asian, 0.2% Pacific Islander, 1.0% from other races, and 7.7% from two or more races. Hispanic or Latino of any race were 4.5% of the population.

There were 228 households, of which 32.9% had children under the age of 18 living with them, 52.2% were married couples living together, 10.1% had a female householder with no husband present, 6.6% had a male householder with no wife present, and 31.1% were non-families. 24.6% of all households were made up of individuals, and 11.8% had someone living alone who was 65 years of age or older. The average household size was 2.72 and the average family size was 3.18.

The median age in the city was 41.4 years. 24.2% of residents were under the age of 18; 8.8% were between the ages of 18 and 24; 21.8% were from 25 to 44; 29.2% were from 45 to 64; and 16.1% were 65 years of age or older. The gender makeup of the city was 52.8% male and 47.2% female.

2000 census
As of the census of 2000, there were 590 people, 208 households, and 151 families living in the city. The population density was 654.4 people per square mile (253.1/km2). There were 230 housing units at an average density of 255.1 per square mile (98.7/km2). The racial makeup of the city was 93.56% White, 0.34% Native American, 1.86% from other races, and 4.24% from two or more races. Hispanic or Latino of any race were 6.61% of the population. 16.2% were of German, 12.5% American, 10.7% Irish, 9.5% English and 5.3% Swedish ancestry.

There were 208 households, out of which 38.5% had children under the age of 18 living with them, 55.3% were married couples living together, 10.6% had a female householder with no husband present, and 27.4% were non-families. 23.6% of all households were made up of individuals, and 9.1% had someone living alone who was 65 years of age or older. The average household size was 2.84 and the average family size was 3.36.

In the city, the age distribution of the population shows 32.9% under the age of 18, 5.9% from 18 to 24, 26.8% from 25 to 44, 22.2% from 45 to 64, and 12.2% who were 65 years of age or older. The median age was 36 years. For every 100 females, there were 97.3 males. For every 100 females age 18 and over, there were 99.0 males.

The median income for a household in the city was $30,750, and the median income for a family was $32,188. Males had a median income of $35,139 versus $16,875 for females. The per capita income for the city was $15,481. About 21.9% of families and 23.7% of the population were below the poverty line, including 28.4% of those under age 18 and 3.1% of those age 65 or over.

Arts and culture

Historic buildings and sites

The city is home to the Gothic-style Grace Evangelical Church of Vader, a National Register of Historic Places recognized building that is in current use under the United Methodist Church.

A second building within Vader is also listed with the NRHP, the Ben Olsen House.

Politics
The results for the 2020 U.S. Presidential Election for Vader were as follows:

 Donald J. Trump (Republican) - 175 (58.52%)
 Joe Biden (Democrat) - 112 (37.46%)
 Jo Jorgensen (Libertarian) - 8 (2.68%)
 Other candidates - 4 (1.34%)

References

Cities in Washington (state)
Cities in Lewis County, Washington